Aleksandr Vladimirovich Revva (born 10 September 1974), better known by his stage name Arthur Pirozhkov, is a Russian stand-up comedian, TV host and voice actor of Ukrainian origin. A former KVN player, in 2006 Revva became a "resident" of the Russian Comedy Club show on TNT. As of 2022, Revva is one of Russia's most popular pop stars, under his pseudonym 'Artur Pirozhkov'.

Early life 
Aleksandr Revva was born in Donetsk, Ukrainian SSR. According to his own statement, announced in the program "Пока Все Дома" (While Everyone's Home), "Revva" is not his original surname. His family, who lived in Estonia and used the name Erwa, immigrated to Ukraine, where he changed his name to Revva. He graduated from the College of Industrial Automation, then the Faculty of Management of the Donetsk State University of Management. He worked as an electrical mechanic at a mine.

Since 1995, he has been a member of the KVN team "Don State Agrarian University" from Donetsk and, since 2000, a member of the KVN team "Burnt by the Sun". As a KVN player, Revva performed alongside his teammate, Mikhail Galustyan.

Television career 

From 2006 to 2013, he was president of the Moscow «Comedy Club». In 2013 he was a host of the show «Repeat!». In 2015, he returned to the television show. In «Comedy Club», he performs acts with Timur Batrutdinov, Garik Martirosyan, Andrei Rozhkov, and Garik Kharlamov.

With Andrey Rozhkov, he led the program NTV "You're Funny!" Under the pseudonym Arthur Pirozhkov. December 25, 2010, the opening of the joint project of the restaurateur Dmitry Orlinsky and Aleksandr Revva - «Spaghetteria», has settled into a two-story house near Tver ulitsy.
November 3, 2013, to January 26, 2014, led by the Channel One show "Repeat!".
From March 3 to May 26, 2014, Revva was one of the judges of the First TV channel, "One to one!". He is currently the producer of the animated series "Kolobanga," which was withdrawn in Orsk, Orenburg Oblast. The series is scheduled for release by the end of 2014 on the channel STS.

Music career 

In 2009, Revva started releasing music under his Arthur Pirozhkov pseudonym. His songs, combining comedic elements with catchy tunes, became very popular, and as of 2022 he is considered one of the most popular Russian pop stars.

Personal life 
Revva is married to Angelia, their daughters are Alisa and Ameli.

Filmography

Actor 
 2005 Comedy Club (TV Series)
 2008 Yeralash (TV show) as Robot teacher
 2008 The Tale of Soldier Fedot, The Daring Fellow as Baba Yaga (voice)
 2008 Adventures of Alenushka and Erema as Voevoda Gordey (voice)
 2009 The New Adventures of Alenushka and Erema as Voevoda Gordei / Hedgehog / Horse (voice)
 2011 Yeralash (TV show) as psychologist
 2011–2014 Zaytsev+1 (TV Series) as Sergei Mavrodi
 2012 Rzhevsky Versus Napoleon as groom
 2013 Understudy as Igor Uspensky / Mikhail Vladlenovich Stasov / Sebastian Ullenovich Vasilkov
 2013 Odnoklassniki: CLICK for Luck as Bum
 2014 Russian: Лёгок на помине as boatman Lenya
 2014 Mixed feelings as Phil
 2014 Parrot Club (TV) as Chaykin (voice)
 2015 Bet on love – poker player
 2016 Magic Cup Rorrima Bo 3D as Brazembeld
 2016 Day all lovers
 2016 Bet on Love as Dyadya Leon
 2016 Son wolverines
 2017 Naughty Grandma as Sanya Rubenstein
 2017 Kolobanga as a grandmother (voice)
 2021 Till Lindemann – Ich hasse Kinder (The Short Movie) as a policeman Mikhail Korepin

Producer 
 2010 The Devil's Flower

Discography

Singles 

 2009 – «Пэрэдайс» Paradise
 2010 – «Революция» "Revolution" (with Quest Pistols)
 2011 – «Плачь, детка» Cry Baby
 2012 – «Я не умею танцевать» I can't dance
 2012 – «Лучший спорт» Best Sport
 2012 – «Красивая песня» Beautiful song
 2013 – «Я-Звезда» I am a Star
 2014 – «Luna» Luna (featuring Vera Brezhneva)
 2014 – «Не плачь, девчонка» Don't Cry Girl
 2015 – «На лету лето» On the fly summer
 2016 – «Я буду помнить» I will remember
 2016 – «#КакЧелентано» #Like Celentano
 2017 – «Либо Любовь» Either Love
 2018 – «Я не Андрей» I'm not Andrey
 2018 – «Чика» Chika
 2018 – «Запутался» Confused
 2019 – «Моя Богиня» My Goddess'(Feat. Doni)
 2019 – «Зацепила»" (She) Hooked (Me)
 2019 – «Алкоголичка» Alcoholic Lady
 2019 – «Она решила сдаться» She Decided to Put Out
 2020 – «Летим со мной» Fly With Me
 2020 – «Перетанцуй меня» "Out-Dance Me"
 2020 – «Перетанцуй меня" Remix Dance Me Remix (with DJ Nejtrino)
 2020 – «#туДЫМ-сюДЫМ» #there-here
 2021 — «#туДЫМ-сюДым Remix #there-here (withс DJ Nejtrino)»
 2021 – "Dancing All Through the Night"
 2021 – «Деньги» Money
 2021 – «Деньги» Remix (with DJ Leo Burn)
 2021 – «Летом на фиесте» Summer at the Fiesta
 2021 – «Задыхаюсь» Suffocatin (cover of a song by Dima Bilan)
 2021 – «Хочешь» Do you want (featuring Klava Koka)
 2022 — «Красивое тело» Beautiful Body

References

External links 

Revva's official website

1974 births
20th-century Russian male actors
21st-century Russian male actors
21st-century Russian male singers
Living people
People from Donetsk
Donetsk State University of Management alumni
Russian stand-up comedians
KVN
Naturalised citizens of Russia
Russian activists against the 2022 Russian invasion of Ukraine
Russian male film actors
Russian male television actors
Russian male voice actors
Russian television presenters
Russian male comedians
Russian National Music Award winners